Issa Adekunle (born 20 December 1997) is a Nigerian footballer who plays as winger for  Železiarne Podbrezová.

Career

Adekunle made his professional Fortuna Liga debut for AS Trenčín against Slovan Bratislava on 25 February 2016. Slovan won the game 4:3. Adekunle played the entire 90 minutes of the match.

References

External links
AS Trenčín official club profile 

Futbalnet Profile 

1997 births
Living people
Nigerian footballers
Nigerian expatriate footballers
Association football forwards
AS Trenčín players
1. FC Tatran Prešov players
FK Inter Bratislava players
FK Slavoj Trebišov players
FK Železiarne Podbrezová players
Slovak Super Liga players
2. Liga (Slovakia) players
Expatriate footballers in Slovakia
Nigerian expatriate sportspeople in Slovakia